Ion tracks are damage-trails created by swift heavy ions penetrating through solids, which may be sufficiently-contiguous for chemical etching in a variety of crystalline, glassy, and/or polymeric solids. They are associated with cylindrical damage-regions several nanometers in diameter and can be studied by Rutherford backscattering spectrometry (RBS), transmission electron microscopy (TEM), small-angle neutron scattering (SANS), small-angle X-ray scattering (SAXS) or gas permeation.

Ion track technology
Ion track technology deals with the production and application of ion tracks in microtechnology and nanotechnology. Ion tracks can be selectively etched in many insulating solids, leading to cones or cylinders, down to 8 nanometers in diameter. Etched track cylinders can be used as filters, Coulter counter microchannels, be modified with monolayers, or be filled by electroplating.

Ion track technology has been developed to fill certain niche areas where conventional nanolithography fails, including:
Direct shaping of radiation-resistant minerals, glasses and polymers
Generation of elongated structures with a resolution limit down to 8 nanometers
Direct generation of holes in thin films without any development process
Defining structural depth by ion range rather than by target thickness
Generating structures with aspect ratio (depth divided by width) up to 104.
Shaping rigid and flexible materials at a defined cutting angle
Exploring the realm of aligned textures with defined inclination angles
Generation of random patterns consisting of partially overlapping single tracks
Generation of large numbers of individual single track structures
Generation of aimed patterns consisting of individual single tracks

Materials susceptible to ion track recording
The class of ion track recording materials is characterized by the following properties:

High homogeneity: Local density variations of the pristine material must be small in comparison to the density deficit of the ion track core. Optically translucent materials, such as polycarbonate and polyvinylidene fluoride, have this property. Grained polymers such as polytetrafluoroethylene do not have this property.
High electrical resistance: Non-conducting dielectric minerals, glasses, and polymers have this property, while highly conducting metals and alloys do not have this property. In metals, the thermal diffusivity is coupled with the electrical conductivity, suppressing the formation of a thermal spike.
High radiation sensitivity: Polymers have high radiation sensitivity as compared to glasses and ionic crystals. The radiation effect in polymers is caused by the secondary electron cascade, inducing both chain scission (dominating in the track core) and cross-linking (dominating in the track halo).
Low atomic mobility: For selective ion track etching, the density contrast between the latent ion track and the pristine material must be high. The contrast fades due to diffusion, depending on the atomic mobility. Ion tracks can be annealed. Erasing is faster in glasses compared to ionic crystals.

Irradiation apparatus and methods
Several types of swift heavy ion generators and irradiation schemes are currently used:

Formation of ion tracks
When a swift heavy ion penetrates through a solid, it leaves behind a trace of irregular and modified material confined to a cylinder of few nanometers in diameter. The energy transfer between the heavy projectile ion and the light target electrons occurs in binary collisions. The knocked-off primary electrons leave a charged region behind, inducing a secondary electron collision cascade involving an increasing number of electrons of decreasing energy. This electron collision cascade stops when ionization is no longer possible. The remaining energy leads to atomic excitation and vibration, producing (heat). Due to the large proton-to-electron mass ratio, the energy of the projectile decreases gradually and the projectile path is straight. A small fraction of the transferred energy remains as an ion track in the solid. The diameter of the ion track increases with increasing radiation sensitivity of the material. Several models are used to describe ion track formation.

According to the ion explosion spike model the primary ionization induces an atomic collision cascade, resulting in a disordered zone around the ion trajectory.

According to the electron collision cascade model the secondary electrons induce a radiation effect in the material, similar to a spatially-confined electron irradiation. The electron collision cascade model is particularly suited for polymers.

According to the thermal spike model, the electron collision cascade is responsible for the energy transfer between the projectile ion and the target nuclei. If the temperature exceeds the melting temperature of the target substance, a liquid is formed. The rapid quenching leaves behind an amorphous state with decreased density. Its disorder corresponds to the ion track.
The thermal spike model suggests the radiation sensitivity of different materials depends on their thermal conductivity and their melting temperature.

Etching methods

Selective ion etching

Selective ion track etching is closely related to the selective etching of grain boundaries and crystal dislocations. The etch process must be sufficiently slow to discriminate between the irradiated and the pristine material. The resulting shape depends on the type of material, the concentration of the etchant, and the temperature of the etch bath. In crystals and glasses, selective etching is due to the reduced density of the ion track. In polymers, selective etching is due to polymer fragmentation in the ion track core. The core zone is surrounded by a track halo in which cross-linking can impede track etching. After removal of the cross-linked track halo, the track radius grows linear in time. The result of selective etching is a trough, pore, or channel.

Surfactant enhanced etching
Surfactant enhanced etching is used to modify ion track shapes. It is based on self-organized monolayers. The monolayers are semi-permeable for the solvated ions of the etch medium and reduce surface attack. Depending on the relative concentration of the surfactant and the etch medium, barrel or cylindrical shaped ion track pores are obtained. The technique can be used to increase the aspect ratio.

Other related terminology
Repeated irradiation and processing: A two-step irradiation and etching process used to create perforated wells.

Arbitrary irradiation angles enforce an anisotropy along one specific symmetry axis.

Multiangular channels are interpenetrating networks consisting of two or more channel arrays in different directions.

1) Sensitizers increase the track etch ratio by breaking bonds or by increasing the free volume.
2) Desensitizers decrease the track etch ratio. Alternatively ion tracks can be thermally annealed.
3) Typical etch bath temperature range. Etch rates increase strongly with concentration and temperature. 
4) Axial etching depends on track etch speed vt, radial etching depends on general etch speed vg.
5) Selectivity (aspect ratio, track etch ratio) = track etch speed / general etch speed = vt / vg.
6) This method requires to remove remaining metal oxide deposits by aqueous HCl solutions.

Replication
Etched ion tracks can be replicated by polymers or metals.
 Replica and template can be used as composite. A replica can be separated from its template mechanically or chemically. Polymer replicas are obtained by filling the etched track with a liquid precursor of the polymer and curing it. Curing can be activated by a catalyst, by ultraviolet radiation, or by heat. Metal replicas can be obtained either by electroless deposition or by electro-deposition. For replication of through-pores, a cathode film is deposited on one side of the membrane, and the membrane is immersed in a metal salt solution. The cathode film is negatively charged with respect to the anode, which is placed on the opposite side of the membrane. The positive metal ions are pulled toward the cathode, where they catch electrons and precipitate as a compact metal film. During electro-deposition, the channels fill gradually with metal, and the lengths of the nano-wires are controlled by the deposition time. Rapid deposition leads to polycrystalline wires, while slow deposition leads to single crystalline wires. A free-standing replica is obtained by removing the template after deposition of a bearing film on the anode side of the membrane.

Interpenetrating wire networks are fabricated by electro-deposition in multi-angle, track-etched membranes. Free-standing three-dimensional networks with tunable complexity and interwire connectivity are obtained.

Segmented nanowires are fabricated by alternating the polarity during electro-deposition. The segment length is adjusted by the pulse duration. In this way electrical, thermal, and optical properties can be tuned.

Applications

Microtechnology: The common mechanical tools of the macroworld are being supplemented and complemented, and in some applications replaced by, particle beams. Here, beams of photons and electrons modify the solubility of radiation-sensitive polymers, so-called "resists", while masking protects a selected area from exposure to radiation, chemical attack, and erosion by atomic impact. Typical products produced in this way are integrated circuits and microsystems. At present, the field of microtechnology is expanding toward nanotechnology. A recent branch of microfabrication is based on manipulation of individual ions.

Geology: Ion tracks are useful as they can remain unaltered for millions of years In minerals. Their density yields information about the time when the mineral solidified from its melt, and are used as geological clocks in fission track dating

Filters: Homoporous filters were among the first applications of ion track technology, and are now fabricated by several companies. Mica membranes with ion track pores were used by Beck and Schultz to determine the mechanism of hindered diffusion in nanopores.

Classifying micro- and nanoparticles: The resistance of a channel filled by an electrolyte depends on the volume of the particle passing through it. This technique is applied to the counting and sizing of individual red blood cells, bacteria, and virus particles.

pH Sensor: Charged channels filled with an electrolyte have a surface conductivity, in addition to the regular volume conductivity, of the electrolyte. Ions attached to a charged surface attract a cloud of mobile counterions. Fixed and mobile ions form a double layer. For small channels, surface conductivity is responsible for most of the charge transport. For small channels, surface conductivity exceeds volume conductivity. Negative surface charges can be occupied by firmly bound protons. At low pH (high proton concentration), the wall charge is completely neutralized. Surface conductivity vanishes. Due to the dependence of surface conductivity on pH, the channel becomes a pH sensor.

Current rectifying pores: Asymmetric pores are obtained by one-sided etching. The geometric asymmetry translates into a conduction asymmetry. The phenomenon is similar to an electrical valve. The pore has two characteristic conduction states, open and closed. Above a certain voltage the valve opens. Below a certain voltage the valve closes.

Thermo-responsive channel: Obtained by lining a channel with a thermo-responsive gel.

Bio-sensor: Chemical modification of the channel wall changes its interaction with passing particles. Different wall claddings bind to specific molecules and delay their passage. In this sense, the wall recognizes the passing particle. As an example, DNA fragments are selectively bound by their complementary fragments. The attached molecules reduce the channel volume. The induced resistance change reflects the molecule's concentration.

Anisotropic conduction: A platform covered with many free standing wires acts as large area field emitter.

Magnetic multilayers: Nano-wires consisting of alternating magnetic/nonmagnetic layers act as magnetic sensors. As an example, cobalt/copper nanowires are obtained from an electrolyte containing both metals. At low voltage, pure copper is deposited while cobalt resists electro-deposition. At high voltage, both metals are deposited as an alloy. If the electrolyte contains predominantly cobalt, a magnetic cobalt-copper alloy is deposited with a high fraction of cobalt. The electrical conductivity of the multilayer wire depends on the applied external magnetic field. The magnetic order of the cobalt layers increases with the applied field. Without magnetic field, neighboring magnetic layers prefer the anti-parallel order. With magnetic field, the magnetic layers prefer the orientation parallel with the magnetic field. The parallel orientation corresponds to a reduced electrical resistance. The effect is used in reading heads of magnetic storage media (the "GMR effect").

Spintronics: Spin valve structure consists of two magnetic layers of different thicknesses. The thick layer has a higher magnetic stability and is used as polarizer. The thin layer acts as analyzer. Depending on its magnetization direction with respect to the polarizer (parallel or antiparallel), its conductivity is low or high, respectively.

Textures: Tilted textures with a hydrophobic coating are at the same time superhydrophobic and anisotropic, and show a preferred direction of transport. The effect has been demonstrated to convert vibration into translation.

Notes

External links

Microtechnology
Nanotechnology
Radiation effects